Kill the Flaw is the eleventh studio album by American rock band Sevendust. It is the third album that is self-produced and recorded at Architekt Music studio in Butler, New Jersey. It was released on October 2, 2015, through 7Bros.

Promotion 
"Thank You" is the album's first single, which is available on iTunes and other digital outlets. On August 27, 2015, The lyric video for the song "Not Today" was made available for streaming via MetalSucks.net, MetalInsider.net and Metal Injection, as well through all digital retailers.  On September 25, 2015, the band made the entire album available for streaming, one week ahead of release.

To promote Kill the Flaw, Sevendust has created "The Making of Kill the Flaw", a series of three webisodes which give fans a look at the process of making the album. Each webisode is filled with exclusive content, behind the scenes footage, interviews, and sneak peeks at the album's songs. The first of three webisodes premiered on September 22. The second webisode premiered on September 29. The third webisode premiered on October 7.

Album title
In an interview with Loudwire, frontman Lajon Witherspoon described the meaning of the album's title:

Reception

Stephen Thomas Erlewine from Allmusic gave the album three and a half out of five stars, describing it as "Returning to their heavy basics". Antihero Magazine's Jake Kussmaul states that "Kill the Flaw delivers the mix of lyrical poignancy and stylistic darkness that longtime fans crave with a ton of heart and a graceful flow."

The album debuted at No. 2 on Billboard's Top Rock Albums chart, selling 21,000 copies in its first week.

Track listing

Personnel 
Credits via AllMusic:

Band
Lajon Witherspoon - lead vocals
Clint Lowery - lead guitar, backing vocals, producer
John Connolly - rhythm guitar, backing vocals
Vinnie Hornsby - bass guitar
Morgan Rose - drums, backing vocals

Other
Mike Ferretti - recording engineer, mixing engineer
Kurt Wubbenhorst - keyboards and sound design
Andy VanDette - mastering
Frank Maddocks - artwork, layout design, photography

Charts

References

External links
 

Sevendust albums
2015 albums
Asylum Records albums